San Benito (Spanish for "St. Benedict") is an unincorporated community in San Benito County, California, United States. The community had a post office from 1869 to 1968.

Climate
This region experiences warm (but not hot) and dry summers, with no average monthly temperatures above 71.6 °F.  According to the Köppen Climate Classification system, San Benito has a warm-summer Mediterranean climate, abbreviated "Csb" on climate maps.

References

Unincorporated communities in California
Unincorporated communities in San Benito County, California